Supayacetus is an extinct genus of basilosaurid cetacean from Middle Eocene (Bartonian stage) deposits of southern Peru.

Etymology 
The genus is named after Supay, the Incan god of death, and ketos Greek for whale.

Description 
Supayacetus is known from the holotype MUSM 1465, a partial skeleton.

Distinguishing characters of Supayacetus include: a T-shaped manubrium with a rod-shaped process; cheek teeth with accessory denticles; a broad scapula with a large infraspinous fossa; humerus with large and hemispherical head, well-defined proximal tuberosities, a long deltopectoral crest, and a broad shaft.  Compared to other basilosaurids,  Supayacetus is larger than Protocetus but its skull and vertebrae are smaller than in other basilosaurids.

References

Bibliography 
 

Basilosauridae
Prehistoric cetacean genera
Eocene mammals of South America
Divisaderan
Paleogene Peru
Fossils of Peru
Fossil taxa described in 2011